Searles may refer to:


People
 Searles (surname)
 Searles G. Shultz (1897–1975), New York politician
 Searles Valentine Wood (1798–1880), English palaeontologist

Places in the United States
 Searles, Minnesota, an unincorporated community and census-designated place
 Searles Lake, a dry lake in the Mojave Desert of California
 Searles Valley, in the Mojave Desert of California

American schools
 Searles School and Chapel, Windham, New Hampshire, on the National Register of Historic Places
 Searles High School, a former school building in Methuen, Massachusetts, on the National Register of Historic Places
 Searles High School (Great Barrington, Massachusetts), a former high school

See also
 Searle (surname)
 Searls

English-language masculine given names